Caledonia Township may refer to the following places in the United States:

 Caledonia Township, Boone County, Illinois
 Caledonia Township, O'Brien County, Iowa
 Caledonia Township, Alcona County, Michigan
 Caledonia Township, Kent County, Michigan
 Caledonia Township, Shiawassee County, Michigan
 Caledonia Township, Houston County, Minnesota

Township name disambiguation pages